Tianjin Bohai Bank Volleyball Club is a professional women's volleyball club based in Tianjin that plays in the Chinese Volleyball League.

Founded in 1993, the team has become a symbolic image of Tianjin Sports and the most successful women’s volleyball team in China. Tianjin Bridgestone have achieved eleven titles in the Chinese Volleyball League, three titles at the National Games of China. Also, they have five champion titles in the AVC Club Championships. Tianjin Bridgestone have been contributing players to the China women's national volleyball team.

History 
As the members of "Golden Generation", Li Shan, Zhang Ping and Zhang Na played the key role in China eventually winning the Gold Medal in 2004 Athens Olympics. In 2008 Beijing Olympics, Li Juan, Wei Qiuyue and Zhang Na assisted China women volleyball team to gain the bronze medal. In addition, Tianjin players Yin Na, Wang Qian, Chen Liyi and Mi Yang have been called up to the national team as well.

Tianjin won the 2012/13 league title defeating Guangdong Evergrande 3-2.

Name evolution 
 Tianjian Kumho Tires Volleyball Club (1997-1999)
 Tianjin Bridgestone Volleyball Club (2000-2011)
 Tianjin Bohai Bank Volleyball Club (2012–present)

CVL results

Honours 

Chinese Volleyball League
 Champions (14): 2002–03, 2003–04, 2004–05, 2006–07, 2007–08, 2008–09, 2009–10, 2010-11, 2012–13, 2015-16, 2017-18, 2019-20, 2020-21 and 2021-22
 Runners-up (3): 2005–06, 2013-14 and 2018–19
 Third Place (3): 2001-02, 2011-12 and 2016-17

Chinese Volleyball Championship
 Champions (4): 2003, 2006, 2007 and 2017
 Runners-up (3): 2012, 2013 and 2015
 Third Place (1): 2011

Chinese Volleyball Cup
 Champions (7): 2004, 2006, 2007, 2008, 2009, 2010 and 2014
 Runners-up (2): 2012, 2013 and 2015
 Third Place (1): 2011

National Games of China
 Champions (4): 2005, 2009, 2013 and 2021

AVC Club Championships
 Champions (5): 2005, 2006, 2008, 2012 and 2019
 Runners-up (3): 2009, 2011 and 2014
 Third Place (1): 2017

FIVB Volleyball Women's Club World Championship
5th: 2012

Team Roster Season 2021—22

Former Team
Team Member 2014 - 2015

As of Jan 2012

Former players
  Ding Hongying (1989–2008)
  Zhang Na (1997–2009)
  Zhang Ping (1998–2007)
  Yang Yanan (2002–2010)
  Li Juan (1998–2013)
  Xue Ming (2012-2013)
  Brižitka Molnar (2014-2015)
  Ivana Nešović (2014-2015)
  Eva Yaneva (2015-2016)
  Nancy Carrillo (2015-2017)
  Brankica Mihajlović (2016-2017)
  Aleksandra Crnčević (2018-2019)
   Melissa Vargas (2021-2022)

References

External links
 Official website

Chinese volleyball clubs